The 1922 Southern Intercollegiate men's basketball tournament took place between teams of both the Southern Conference  and Southern Intercollegiate Athletic Association from February 24–March 1, 1922, at Municipal Auditorium in Atlanta, Georgia. The North Carolina Tar Heels won their first Southern Conference title.

Bracket

* Overtime game

Consolation game

Championship

All-Southern tournament team

See also
List of Southern Conference men's basketball champions

References

1921–22 Southern Conference men's basketball season
Southern Conference men's basketball tournament
Tournament
Southern Intercollegiate men's basketball tournament
Southern Intercollegiate men's basketball tournament
Southern Intercollegiate men's basketball tournament
Basketball competitions in Atlanta
College basketball tournaments in Georgia (U.S. state)
1920s in Atlanta